Thomas Alan Smith Rosenthal (born 14 January 1988) is an English actor, comedian, and writer. He is best known for his television roles as Jonny Goodman in Friday Night Dinner (2011–2020) and Marcus Gallo in Plebs (2013–2022). He has written and performed three stand-up comedy shows: Child of Privilege (2011), благодаря (2013), and Manhood (2019–2020), the latter of which received critical acclaim at the 2019 Edinburgh Fringe Festival.

Early life
Thomas Alan Smith Rosenthal was born in the Hammersmith area of London on 14 January 1988, the son of Newsnight producer Christine (née Smith) and television sports presenter Jim Rosenthal. He is of German-Jewish descent through his father, with one of his paternal great-grandfathers being German-Jewish physician and writer Oscar Levy. He was once dubbed a "super-smart child of privilege" by the London Evening Standard. He grew up in Cookham, Berkshire, and read philosophy at King's College London. His early comedic influences were the TV shows Spaced, Brass Eye, and Da Ali G Show.

Career

In 2011, Rosenthal was cast as Jonny Goodman in the Channel 4 sitcom Friday Night Dinner, alongside Simon Bird, Tamsin Greig, Paul Ritter, and Mark Heap. The sitcom focused on the weekly Shabbat dinner in the middle-class secular Jewish Goodman family in North London. Rosenthal played the younger son and he and Greig are the only two cast members who have Jewish roots in real life. The sixth and final series set the record for the highest audience for any comedy on Channel 4 or E4 for 16-to-34 year olds with a 49.3% share, and the average audience for the series was 3.9 million viewers. Following the death of Ritter in 2021, it was announced that the show would not continue. To celebrate the 10th anniversary of the start of the show, an anniversary special was aired in May 2021.

In 2013, he was cast as Marcus in the ITV sitcom Plebs. The sitcom is a comedy set in Ancient Rome, following the main characters of Marcus, Stylax, and Grumio. In 2020, it was announced that a sixth series would not be commissioned and instead a feature-length special would be released.

In 2014, he created and starred in a comedy pilot for BBC iPlayer with Naz Osmanoglu, entitled Flat TV, which was later commissioned into a mini-series.

In 2015, he played a brief role as Gary Thorp in the ITV drama series Broadchurch.

In 2019, he played Private Pike in Dad's Army: The Lost Episodes, a recreation of three missing episodes of the BBC sitcom Dad's Army. That same year, his third stand-up show Manhood received critical acclaim at the Edinburgh Fringe Festival.

Personal life
Rosenthal was in a relationship with TV and radio presenter, Vick Hope from 2013 to 2017. He is an avid fan of Arsenal FC, in stark contrast with his father's support for Oxford United FC.

Rosenthal said of his Jewish roots in 2011, "I get called a Jewish comedian and I'm totally fine with that, but I can't really inform either of the performances I've done this year with a Jewish background. But I have learnt a lot about the culture and it has given me great pride to do so."

In 2019, Rosenthal began to speak out about his negative experience with circumcision and his opposition to it, as well as speaking about how the experience intersected with his struggles with obsessive-compulsive disorder. He stated, "The truth is that my parents were put in charge of my welfare and they did something to me that can never be remedied. [...] The last proper Jew in our family was four generations back. My dad was circumcised for medical reasons, which is another bloody rabbit hole because a lot of those cases are misdiagnosed. [...] The aim is to recognise that if this has happened to you and you feel fine about it, that's great. But if you don't feel fine, which I don't, then you're justified."

Filmography

Television

Film

Stand-up comedy shows

Achievements

 Laughing Horse New Act of the Year Commended Finalist 2008
 Amused Moose Laugh-Off Finalist 2008
 Paramount Funniest Student Winner 2009 (video available)
 Chortle Student Comedian of the Year Finalist 2009
 Nominated for a British Comedy Award as Best Breakthrough Act of 2011, alongside Greg Davies, Micky Flanagan and Angelos Epithemiou.
 Leicester Mercury Comedian of the Year (Joint winner with Ben Target) 2011

References

External links

 
 
 

1988 births
Living people
21st-century English comedians
21st-century English male actors
Alumni of King's College London
English male comedians
English male television actors
English people of German-Jewish descent
People educated at Reading Blue Coat School
People from Cookham
People with obsessive–compulsive disorder